Yankeetown is an unincorporated community in Anderson Township, Warrick County, in the U.S. state of Indiana.

History
A post office was established at Yankeetown in 1853, and remained in operation until 1911. The community was officially laid out in 1858, and was so named for the fact the first settlers were Yankees.

Geography

References

Unincorporated communities in Warrick County, Indiana
Unincorporated communities in Indiana